The 1975 French Open was a tennis tournament that took place on the outdoor clay courts at the Stade Roland Garros in Paris, France. The tournament ran from 4 June until 15 June. It was the 79th staging of the French Open, and the second Grand Slam tennis event of 1975. Björn Borg won the men's singles title and Chris Evert won the women's single title.

Finals

Men's singles 

 Björn Borg defeated  Guillermo Vilas, 6–2, 6–3, 6–4 
It was Borg's 2nd career Grand Slam title, and his 2nd (consecutive) French Open title.

Women's singles

 Chris Evert defeated  Martina Navratilova, 2–6, 6–2, 6–1 
It was Evert's 3rd career Grand Slam title, and her 2nd (consecutive) French Open title.

Men's doubles

 Brian Gottfried /  Raúl Ramírez defeated  John Alexander /  Phil Dent, 6–4, 2–6, 6–2, 6–4

Women's doubles

 Chris Evert /  Martina Navratilova defeated  Julie Anthony /  Olga Morozova, 6–3, 6–2

Mixed doubles

 Fiorella Bonicelli /  Thomaz Koch defeated  Pam Teeguarden /  Jaime Fillol, 6–4, 7–6

Prize money

References

External links
 French Open official website

 
1975 Grand Prix (tennis)
1975 in French tennis
1975 in Paris